Epitamyra birectalis is a species of snout moth in the genus Epitamyra. It was described by George Hampson in 1897, and is known from the Lesser Antilles (including Saint Lucia), Guatemala and Florida.

References

Moths described in 1897
Chrysauginae